Legacy of Violence: A History of the British Empire is a 2022 nonfiction history book by American historian and professor Caroline Elkins. It covers the history of the British Empire from the Bengal Famine of 1770, to the days of Prime Minister Winston Churchill, up until the late 1950s and early 1960s.

Background 
Caroline Elkins' first book was Imperial Reckoning: The Untold Story of Britain's Gulag in Kenya (2005), for which she won the 2006 Pulitzer Prize for General Nonfiction. Imperial Reckoning examines human rights abuses in British detention facilities in Kenya during the Mau Mau rebellion. Elkins states that she wrote Legacy of Violence to respond to unanswered questions which had been raised in Imperial Reckoning. Elkins describes her research for Legacy of Violence as "arduous," in part because there were so many missing documents relating to the detention camps or to colonial Kenya in general. In 2009, four years after the publication of Imperial Reckoning, five survivors of the British detention camps in Kenya had sued the British government, and Elkins had appeared as an expert witness on the survivors' behalf. During the investigation, the British Foreign and Commonwealth Office (FCO) discovered 300 boxes of documents relating to the British detention facilities. Elkins began research for Legacy of Violence shortly after, combing through both the newly released documents as well as 8,800 files from 36 other colonies, and expanding her research to pre-World War II Britain.

Overview 

Legacy of Violence is a comprehensive and meticulously researched account of the violent and oppressive practices of the British Empire throughout its history. The book challenges the traditional narrative of the empire as a benign and civilizing force and instead presents a damning indictment of its brutal tactics and exploitative policies.

Elkins begins by examining the impact of British colonization on Kenya, where the empire's policies of forced labor, land confiscation, and repression led to a brutal campaign of violence against the indigenous population. She details the horrific practices of the British administration, including the use of concentration camps, torture, and summary executions.

The book then expands to examine the broader legacy of the British Empire, exploring its impact on other countries such as India and Ireland. Elkins highlights the ways in which the empire used violence and coercion to maintain control over its subjects, resulting in deep-seated trauma, conflict, and inequality.

Throughout the book, Elkins exposes the often hidden and overlooked atrocities committed by the British Empire, including massacres, forced sterilization, and the use of chemical weapons. She also challenges the myths and justifications used to justify British colonialism, such as the idea of the "civilizing mission" and the supposed superiority of British culture.

Legacy of Violence  is a powerful and important work that sheds light on the corrupt and violent history of the British Empire. It serves as a reminder of the devastating impact of colonialism on the world and highlights the ongoing struggles for justice and equality in its aftermath.

Reception 
Tim Adams wrote of the book in The Guardian, "Legacy of Violence is a formidable piece of research that sets itself the ambition of identifying the character of British power over the course of two centuries and four continents." Nicholas Sprenger stated "This is a must-read for anyone interested in the history of the British Empire or imperialism at large." The book was reviewed by many including Kirkus, David Kermer, Publishers Weekly, Sarah Shaffi, New Statesman, Waterstones, Financial Times, and New York Times, being a top 100 notable book of 2022 of the New York Times. The book was included in the Best history books of 2022 by historian R.J.B. Bosworth. It also made the list of BBC History Magazine’s Books of the Year 2022.

See also 
 Caroline Elkins
 Bengal famine of 1770
 Foreign and Commonwealth Office migrated archives
 Imperial Reckoning: The Untold Story of Britain's Gulag in Kenya
 Mau Mau rebellion

References

Further reading 
 Caroline Elkins' Staff profile, Harvard University.
 Benton, Lauren. Evil Empires? The Long Shadow of British Colonialism, July/August 2022, Foreign Affairs.
 Bergen, Peter.  The British Empire: A legacy of violence? Caroline Elkins interviewed by Peter Bergen, CNN National Security Analyst, September 25, 2022.
 Elkins, Caroline. Britain Can No Longer Hide Behind the Myth That Its Empire Was Benign, April 2, 2022, Time.
 Elkins, Caroline. “Looking beyond Mau Mau: Archiving Violence in the Era of Decolonization.” The American Historical Review, vol. 120, no. 3, 2015, pp. 852–68.
 Elkins, Caroline.  'Legacy of Violence' documents the dark side of the British Empire July 11, 2022, Caroline Elkins interviewed by Arun Venungopal, Podcast link

Colonialism
Imperialism
2022 non-fiction books
History books about the British Empire